The following Confederate units and commanders fought in the First Battle of Bull Run on July 21, 1861. The Union order of battle is shown separately. Order of battle compiled from the army organization during the battle and the reports.

Abbreviations used

Military rank
 BG = Brigadier General
 Col = Colonel
 Ltc = Lieutenant Colonel
 Maj = Major
 Cpt = Captain
 Lt = Lieutenant

Other
 (w) = wounded
 (mw) = mortally wounded
 (k) = killed in action
 (c) = captured

Confederate forces
BG Joseph E. Johnston, Commanding

Army of the Potomac

BG P. G. T. Beauregard

General Staff:
 Chief of Staff: Col Thomas Jordan
 Chief Engineer: Ltc Thomas H. Williamson
 Chief Signal Officer: Cpt Edward P. Alexander

Headquarters Escort:
 Lay's Squadron (Virginia) Cavalry: Cpt John F. Lay

Army of the Shenandoah

BG Joseph E. Johnston

General Staff:
 Chief of Artillery: Col William N. Pendleton
 Chief Engineer: Maj William H.C. Whiting

Notes

References
 Manassas National Battlefield Park - The Battle of First Manassas.
 Sibley, Jr., F. Ray, The Confederate Order of Battle, Volume 1, The Army of Northern Virginia, Shippensburg, Pennsylvania, 1996. 
 The Manassas Campaign, Virginia, July 21, 1861.
 Robert Underwood Johnson, Clarence Clough Buell, Battles and Leaders of the Civil War: The Opening Battles, Volume 1 (Pdf), New York: The Century Co., 1887.
 U.S. War Department, The War of the Rebellion: a Compilation of the Official Records of the Union and Confederate Armies, U.S. Government Printing Office, 1880–1901.

American Civil War orders of battle